Louis Malter (April 28, 1907 – May 7, 1985) was an American physicist specializing in vacuum tube research and high-vacuum systems. He is known for his 1936 discovery of the eponymous Malter effect.

Biography
Louis Malter was born on April 28, 1907, in New York City. He graduated in 1926 with a B.S. from the College of the City of New York. He then taught physics at the college from 1926 to 1928. In 1931, Malter received his M.A. from Cornell University, and he received his Ph.D. in 1936. After receiving his Ph.D., Malter was employed by the RCA, first working in the Acoustic Research and Photophone Division between 1928 and 1930, then at the RCA Manufacturing Company between 1933 and 1942.

In 1941, Malter was elected a Fellow of the American Physical Society. From 1943 to 1946, Malter led the RCA Manufacturing Company's Special Development Division. In May 1946, Malter became the head of the Naval Research Laboratory's Vacuum Tube Research Section in Washington, D.C., before returning to RCA in 1949. Between 1949 and 1955, Malter corresponded with Leonard Benedict Loeb.  In the early 1950s, Malter was the Chief Engineer of the RCA Semiconductor Division. In the late 1950s, he was recruited to direct the Varian Vacuum Division of Varian Associates in Palo Alto, California. In the 1970s, Malter acted as an expert on high-vacuum systems at Linus Pauling's Institute of Orthomolecular Medicine.

Personal life
Malter died on May 7, 1985, in San Mateo, California. He was married twice, and had three children.

Selected publications
 
 
 
 
  (After receiving his Ph.D. from Massachusetts Institute of Technology, D. B. Langmuir worked for RCA in Harrison, New Jersey. During WW II he worked with Vannevar Bush. )
 
 
  1950 (over 850 citations)

References

1907 births
1985 deaths
City College of New York alumni
Cornell University alumni
RCA people
Silicon Valley people
20th-century American physicists
Fellows of the American Physical Society